Svensk exegetisk årsbok (Swedish Exegetical Yearbook) is an annual peer-reviewed academic journal of biblical studies and book reviews in Swedish and English. It was established in 1936 by the Swedish Exegetical Society and is distributed internationally by Eisenbrauns. The editor-in-chief is Göran Eidevall (Uppsala university).

See also
List of theological journals
 Open access in Sweden

External links
 
 Swedish Exegetical Society

Biblical studies journals
Multilingual journals
Publications established in 1936
Annual journals
Eisenbrauns academic journals